Miroslav Holeňák (born 10 February 1976) is a retired Czech footballer. He played mostly as defender but was also capable of playing in midfield.

Club career
Miroslav Holeňák began with football at the age of eight in his hometown Zlín, going on to make his professional debut as a midfielder in the 1993–94 season. Holeňák quickly became a starting player and three years later transferred to Petra Drnovice. After four years in Moravia Holeňák moved to Slovan Liberec for 14 million Czech crowns. Converted to a central defender, he went on to make a major contribution as the team secured the 2001–02 league title and was called up to the Czech national team. At the end of the 2002–03 season, it had appeared as though he would move to Sparta Prague, before he ultimately opted for a transfer to their rivals Slavia.

After the expiration of his contract Holeňák left the Gambrinus liga and joined the Austrian Bundesliga team SV Mattersburg. Only one year later Holeňák returned to the Czech Republic and again signed with FC Slovan Liberec.

International career
Holeňák debuted for the Czech national team on 27 March 2002 in a 0–0 draw against Wales in Cardiff. His second start came in April of the same year in Ioannina against Greece. His last match was a 4–1 victory against Slovakia in August 2002. He was included in the squad for the match against Austria on 11 October 2003 but did not start.

References

External links
 
 
 Club Profile 

1976 births
Living people
Sportspeople from Zlín
Association football defenders
Association football midfielders
Czech footballers
Czech Republic youth international footballers
Czech Republic under-21 international footballers
Czech Republic international footballers
Czech First League players
SK Slavia Prague players
FC Slovan Liberec players
FC Fastav Zlín players
SV Mattersburg players
FK Drnovice players
Austrian Football Bundesliga players
Expatriate footballers in Austria
Czech expatriate sportspeople in Austria